Jordie is a given name and a nickname of the name Jordan (name). Notable people with the name include:

 Jordie Albiston (1961–2022), Australian poet and academic
 Jordie Barrett (born 1997), New Zealand rugby union player
 Jordie Bellaire, American comic book colorist
 Jordie Benn (born 1987), Canadian ice hockey player
 Jordie Briels (born 1991), Dutch football midfielder
 Jordie Ireland (born 1997), Australian musician
 Jordie McKenzie (born 1990), Australian rules footballer

See also
 Jordi
 Jordy
 Jordan (name)

English-language masculine given names
English masculine given names